The 1940–41 Ljubljana Subassociation League was the 22nd and final season of the Ljubljana Subassociation League. SK Ljubljana won the league for the second time. In this season, all Slovenian top tier clubs participated, as the previously played 1939–40 Croatian-Slovenian League, which corresponded to the Yugoslav first tier along with the 1939–40 Serbian League, was disbanded and a separate Croatian and Slovenian leagues were formed.

Final table

References

External links
Football Association of Slovenia 

Slovenian Republic Football League seasons
Yugo
1
Football
Football